Megalotheca was an African genus of bush cricket in the subfamily Conocephalinae - now considered a subgenus - see: Conocephalus.

References

Tettigoniidae
Insect subgenera